The Dormition of the Theotokos Church is a Macedonian Orthodox church in the neighbourhood of Novo Selo, Štip. The church is the seat of the Novo Selo Parish. The church is registered as a Cultural Heritage of North Macedonia.

History
The church began construction in 1836 and was completed in 1850. It was built by the builder Andreja Damjanov with his group of brothers and is a large three-nave basilica with spacious galleries on the first floor. The icons of the iconostasis are from the same period, made by painter Stanislav Dospevski, Stanilov, Vangelov, Krste zograf, Teodosie, Dimitar Papradiški, Hristo from Samokov, Zaharija Samokovlija, and the frescoes on the domes are presumed to have been made in the same period by јано The depth of the iconostasis, the canopy, the royal doors and the bishop's throne were made in the same period by Nikola Damjanov. There is no information when and by which hierarch she was consecrated.

Gallery

See also
 Novo Selo School - the building of the former school and the present seat of the Rectorate of the Goce Delčev University. It is also a cultural heritage site
 Holy Trinity Church - the cemetery church and a cultural heritage site
 Ascension of Christ Church - a cultural heritage site
 Saint John the Baptist Church - a cultural heritage site

References

External Links
 The official website of Breganica Diocese

Churches in North Macedonia
Cultural heritage of North Macedonia